James Banks may refer to:
James Arthur Banks (1897–1967), Scottish civil engineer
James A. Banks (born 1941), American professor at the University of Washington, Seattle
James Banks III, American basketball player
Jim Banks (born 1979), United States Congressman from Indiana

Football and soccer
James Banks (footballer), English footballer
Jimmy Banks (1964–2019), American soccer defender
Jimmy Banks (English footballer) (1893–1942), English footballer
Jimmy Banks (rugby league), English rugby league footballer of the 1970s for Doncaster

See also
Jimmy Bancks, an Australian cartoonist best known for his comic strip Ginger Meggs
James Bankes, MP for Appleby